László Németh (18 April 1901 – 3 March 1975) was a Hungarian dentist, writer, dramatist and essayist. He was born in Nagybánya the son of József Németh (1873–1946) and Vilma Gaál (1879–1957). Over the Christmas of 1925, he married Ella Démusz (1905–1989), the daughter of János Démusz, a keeper of a public house. Between 1926 and 1944 they had six daughters, but two of them died in infancy. In 1959 he visited the Soviet Union. In the last part of his life he lived and worked in Tihany.  He died from a stroke on 3 March 1975 in Budapest and was buried in Farkasréti Cemetery, Budapest, where he shares a grave with his wife.

Medical and teaching career
Németh was awarded a degree in dentistry in 1925, and worked in Szent János Hospital. He founded a dental practice, but later became a medical practitioner for schools.

In 1926 he opened his dental surgery, although he continued to work as a freelance at the Saint John's Hospital in the Department of Neurology. He was a medical practitioner for Toldy School from 1926 to 1927, at the Egressy Street School from 1928 to 1931, and at Medve Street School from 1933 to 1943, when he retired as a medical practitioner. In the winter of 1927 he contracted tuberculosis and travelled to Italy and Felsőgöd to convalesce, retiring from his career as a dentist.

Between 1945 and 1948 he was a casual teacher in the history of Hungarian literature, in mathematics, and other subjects, at the grammar school in Hódmezővásárhely. In 1946 Minister of Education Dezső Keresztury offered him a job as a school inspector for the College of Further Education, and he worked arranging the college's curriculum.

Literary career
In December 1925 Németh won the first prize in a competition run by Nyugat magazine for his novel , ("Mrs Horváth Dies").

(In the "Protestant Review" and "Sunrise" he wrote under the pen name of László Lelkes.

The following year he and his wife travelled to Italy and France. In 1929 he had his first novel published in that magazine,  ("Human Play"). In 1931 he took a  – the equivalent of a General Certificate of Education – in Greek language, and later he studied it at university for a short while.

On 29 November 1931 he attended a literary dinner in Debrecen hosted by the Ady Association, where five folk writers (Gyula Illyés, János Kodolányi, Lőrinc Szabó and himself) were warmly received at their public reading.

His relationship with Nyugat broke down. In 1943 he wrote a monograph  ("Instead of me") in which he stated that one of the reasons for this breakdown was Kodolányi, who disliked the fact that Németh had written a strongly worded letter to Lóránt Basch, who was also a trustee of the Baumgarten Foundation, suggesting that Kodolányi should be given financial assistance. Because of this, the other trustee, Mihály Babits didn't want to help him. It ended embarrassingly, as Németh was in Babits' flat when Basch telephoned Babits to tell him about Németh's letter. From 1932 Németh wrote no more for Nyugat.

During his leadership he tried to encourage and promote contemporary Hungarian literature. In his programmes there were many writers and poets who read their own works and discussed them with Németh – they became well known at the time. The programme became very popular and it influenced later Hungarian literature and the Hungarian Radio Corporation's programme scheduling policy.

In 1934 Németh's had his first book published,  ("Human and role").

On 30 March 1938 the National Theatre premiered one of his plays, Villámfénynél ("Lightning"). Later on the theatre had two other productions based on his works: Papucshős ("Silent Hero") on 4 November 1939, and Cseresznyés ("Cherry Orchard") on 10 January 1942.  On 13 May 1939 the National Theatre introduced his historical play, VII. Gergely ("Gregory VII").

Németh collected his monographs and published them in a book called A minőség forradalma ("The Revolution of Quality"). He was one of the lecturers at a conference in Balatonszárszó. At this conference he made a statement about Judaism, which influenced his life and others' attitude towards his works.
From 1944 and on, when he made the same speech at conferences he omitted his remarks about Judaism.

From 19 March 1944, during the German occupation he lived in Göd, Szilasbalhás and Budapest. For a short while he stopped writing articles for magazines. After the Soviet Red Army occupied Budapest, Németh and his family moved to Békés.

In 1969 the publishers Magvető and  issued his Collected Works.

Awards

 1951 – the Attila József Prize for his translation of Leo Tolstoy's work Anna Karenina
 1957 – the Kossuth Prize (he gave the prize money to the Hódmezővásárhely school's library)
 1961 – Gold Order of Merit for Work
 1965 – the Herder Prize
 1968 – the Batsányi Prize.

Works
The English names of the works are approximate translations and are not published titles of them.

Novels
 Emberi Színjáték (1929) ("Human Play")
 Gyász (1935) ("Mourning")

The protagonist Zsófi Kurátor has lost her husband. After she loses her child too, she spends the rest of her life in mourning. Because she follows the rules of a widow, people in her village treat her as an outcast. The whole community scrutinises her every act: can no man tempt her?

 Iszony (1947) ("Loathing"/"Revulsion")

The protagonist Nelli Kárász is a loner and uninterested in men. After her arranged marriage, Nelli's marriage and life are unhappy. She hates being dependent on her husband, hates the prison of her marriage. Her husband, Sanyi Takaró, abuses her body and soul. Nelli tries to be a good housekeeper, but at the same time a bad wife, because she wants to annoy her husband in the hope that he will leave her. Her husband, however, tries to make his marriage as happy as possible and looks up to his wife as a goddess. Sanyi becomes jealous of one of their friends, even though he knows that Nelli is not interested in him. As the marriage goes downhill Sanyi has affairs with servant girls. The marriage ends with his death: he is very ill and, against doctor's advice, he tries to have sex with Nelli, who resists. In the middle of the battle his heart stops as Nelli smothers his face with a pillow. It is not clear whether he dies of choking or suffocation.

 Égető Eszter (1948) ("Eszter Égető")

The protagonist Eszter tries to fight against life's difficulties. She has three children and a happy marriage, until her husband cheats on her. She looks after her father, helps with their farm, and supports village life. Eszter struggles to make her home, marriage and life happy.

 Irgalom ("Mercy")

Plays

 Bodnárné (1931) ("Mrs Bodnár")
 II. József ("Joseph II")
 VII. Gergely ("Gregory VII")
 Villámfénynél ("Lightning")
 Pusztuló magyarok (1936–1946) ("Dying Hungarians")
 Papucshős (1938) ("Silent Hero")
 Erzsébet-nap (1940–46) ("Saint Elisabeth's Day")
 Széchenyi (1946) ("Széchenyi")
 Eklézsia-megkövetés (1946) ("Megkövetés Ecclesiology")
 Husz János (1948) ("Jan Hus")
 Galilei (1953) ("Galilei")
 Az áruló (1954)  ("The Traitor")
 Petőfi Mezőberényben (1954) ("Petőfi in Mezőberény")
 Apáczai (1955) ("Apáczai")
 A két Bolyai (1961) ("The two Bolyais") (Bolyai is a family name)
 Csapda ("Trap")
 Gandhi halála ("Gandhi's Death")
 Nágy próféta (verses) ("The Four Apostles")  (in poetic form)
 Utazás (1961) ("Journey")
 Nagy család  ("Large Family")
 Harc a jólét ellen (1964) ("Fight Against Luxury")

Essays
A minőség forradalma (1940) ("The Revolution of Quality")
Készülődés (1941) ("Preparation")
Kisebbségben (1942) ("In the Minority")
Sajkódi esték (1961) ("Evenings in Sajkód")
A kísérletező ember (1963) ("The Experimental Human")

Memorials

 A statue by Róbert Csíkszentmihályi, unveiled on 28 April 2006 at the corner of Pasarét and Radnai streets in Budapest.
 László Németh Prize
 László Németh Grammar School, Budapest XIII.
 László Németh Lyceum, Nagybánya, at 1 Luminişului Street
 László Németh Primary School, Budapest VIII.
 László Németh Primary School, Felsőgöd
 László Németh Primary School, Mezőszilas
 László Németh Primary School, Székesfehérvár

References

Sources
All the following links and sources are in Hungarian.
  (Membership required)

External links

 
 

1901 births
1975 deaths
People from Baia Mare
National Peasant Party (Hungary) politicians
Hungarian essayists
Male essayists
Hungarian male dramatists and playwrights
Hungarian dentists
20th-century Hungarian dramatists and playwrights
Burials at Farkasréti Cemetery
20th-century essayists
Herder Prize recipients
20th-century Hungarian male writers
Baumgarten Prize winners
Attila József Prize recipients
20th-century dentists